Cape of Good Films, earlier known as Hari Om Entertainment Co. is an Indian film production and distribution company established by actor Akshay Kumar in 2008, based in Mumbai, India.

History 
'Hari Om' happens to be the name of Kumar's father. The company in association with Telefilm Canada produced a hockey based Indo-Canadian film Speedy Singhs (2011). 

It has produced National Award-winning films Rustom (2016), Pad Man (2018), and some of critically acclaimed and commercially successful films such as Singh is Kinng (2008), Holiday (2014), Baby (2015), Airlift (2016), Toilet: Ek Prem Katha (2017), Chumbak (2018), Mission Mangal (2019), Kesari (2019), Good Newwz (2019) and Sooryavanshi (2021).

Most of the films are starred by Kumar himself.

Films productions

Hindi films

Marathi films

References

External links 
 Hari Om Entertainment Company In Conversation With Team Box Office India

Film production companies based in Mumbai
Akshay Kumar
Indian companies established in 2008
Mass media companies established in 2008
2008 establishments in Maharashtra